Francis Wedgwood may refer to:

 Francis Wedgwood (1800–1888), English potter
 Francis Wedgwood, 2nd Baron Wedgwood (1898–1959), English baron
 Francis Hamilton Wedgwood (1867–1930), English sheriff and businessman